Clarence Casper "Dutch" Hoffman (January 28, 1904 – December 6, 1962) was an outfielder in Major League Baseball. He played for the Chicago White Sox in 1929. Hoffman served as the President of the Mississippi-Ohio Valley League and the Midwest League from 1949 to 1962, overseeing the growth and reorganization of the leagues.

References

External links

1904 births
1962 deaths
Major League Baseball outfielders
Chicago White Sox players
Baseball players from Illinois